Thomas Henry Rust (3 March 1881 – 9 August 1962) was an English cricketer.  Rust was a right-handed batsman. He was born at Gloucester, Gloucestershire.

Rust made a single first-class appearance for Gloucestershire against Lancashire at the Spa Ground, Gloucester, in the 1914 County Championship.  Batting first, Gloucestershire made 155, with Rust being run out after scoring 2 runs.  Lancashire responded by making 394 in their first-innings, while Gloucestershire were dismissed for 206 in their second-innings, with Rust being dismissed for a duck by Bill Huddleston.  Lancashire won the match by an innings and 33 runs.

Rust also had a distinguished local football career, playing and captaining Gloucester City 62 times from 1898-1907, scoring 41 goals.

He died at Tredworth, Gloucestershire on 9 August 1962.

References

External links
Thomas Rust at ESPNcricinfo
Thomas Rust at CricketArchive

1881 births
1962 deaths
Cricketers from Gloucester
Footballers from Gloucester
English cricketers
Gloucestershire cricketers
Gloucester City A.F.C. players
Association footballers not categorized by position
English footballers